Nirtenia is an Afrotropical genus of potter wasps.

References

Biological pest control wasps
Potter wasps